Herbert Schwarz (born 8 March 1953) is a German former speed skater. He competed at the 1972 Winter Olympics, the 1976 Winter Olympics and the 1980 Winter Olympics.

References

External links
 

1953 births
Living people
German male speed skaters
Olympic speed skaters of West Germany
Speed skaters at the 1972 Winter Olympics
Speed skaters at the 1976 Winter Olympics
Speed skaters at the 1980 Winter Olympics
People from Bad Aibling
Sportspeople from Upper Bavaria